Cheltenham Town Football Club is a professional association football club based in the town of Cheltenham, Gloucestershire, England.  From the 2021–22 season, the club compete in League One, the third tier of the English football league system, after winning the League Two title. Nicknamed the "Robins", they have played at Whaddon Road since 1932. The club contests rivalries with Gloucester City and Forest Green Rovers.

Founded in 1887, the club spent much of its early history competing in local football circles, before moving to the Birmingham Combination in 1932 and then the Southern League in 1935. They spent the next 50 years in the Southern League, winning the Midland Division in 1982–83 and then claiming the Premier Division title in 1984–85. They were subsequently promoted into the Alliance Premier League in 1985, where they remained for seven seasons until they were relegated in 1992. They finished as runners-up of the Southern League Premier Division for four of the next five seasons, and were promoted into the Conference in 1997.

Under the stewardship of Steve Cotterill, Cheltenham won the 1998 FA Trophy final and then secured promotion into the Football League for the first time after winning the Conference title in 1998–99. He left the club after the 2001–02 season, having guided them to the FA Cup fifth round and promotion with victory in the 2002 Third Division play-off final. Immediately relegated after one season in the Second Division, they secured another promotion as manager John Ward guided them to victory in the 2006 League Two play-off final. Relegated after three seasons in the third tier, the club's 16-year stay in the Football League ended with relegation back to the National League in 2015. However manager Gary Johnson led Cheltenham to the Conference title with a 101 point tally in 2015–16, making them the first club in 26 years to secure an immediate return to the Football League as champions of the Conference. After Michael Duff took over from Johnson, he led the club to its first Football League title, winning the 2020–21 League Two title.

History

Early Years: 1887-1940
Cheltenham has a history of football prior to The Robins. In 1849, the first use of three official referees in a match, two in field and one in tribune, was recorded in the town. However, the modern club was founded in 1887 by Albert Close White, a local teacher.

The club spent its first three decades in local football. Notable players from those days included former England international Philip Bach, cricketers Gilbert Jessop and brothers Charles Barnett and Edgar Barnett..

In December 1931 the club moved to Whaddon Road and turned semi-professional in 1932-33, joining the Birmingham Combination whilst adopting new colours of red and white hooped shirts, black shorts, and red and white stockings. Former England international George Blackburn was appointed player coach, and led the team to third place in their debut season. The following year the club entered the FA Cup, featuring a ten game journey to the third round before losing to Blackpool in front of a record attendance at the Athletic Ground in Cheltenham. Following a disappointing season in 1934-35, brightened only by winning the Leamington Hospital Cup and the discovery and sale of centre froward James Currier to Bolton Wanderers, the club applied for membership and were accepted to join the Southern League for the 1935-1936 season.

Town kicked-off their debut Southern League campaign with two firsts. The club appointed its first manager with "complete power" of team selection in George Carr, and fielded an all professional eleven in the first game of the season against Barry. Despite a flying start in the season opener, Town could only finish sixth in the Western and ninth in the Central sections of the league. However, the season did feature an FA Cup run to the first round where Brighton and Hove Albion were taken to a replay. A notable result during the run was the club's record victory, beating Chippenham Rovers 12-0 in the Third Round Qualifying.

The 1936-37 season was Carr's last, resigning in April 1937. Town finished eleventh as the Southern League switched to a single division, with the side featuring appearances from future England international Tim Ward before his move to Derby County. Off the field, the club moved to establish itself as a limited company.

Carr's replacement was former Arsenal forward James Brain. After losing two stalwart performers for the club - Cliff Lang to illness and Ernie Williams to injury - Brain couldn't improve on eleventh place in the league. But he took the team to the FA Cup first round, losing 3-0 to Watford, while Newport County knocked Town out the Welsh Cup at the quarter-final stage. Two of the side's consistent performers, winger Cliff Thorley and goalkeeper Jack Wheeler earned moves to Bristol City and Birmingham respectively. Crisis was averted when players, shareholders and supporters contributed to keep the club in business following a financial crunch.

Cheltenham rebranded as "The Robins" for the 1938-39 campaign, wearing white shirts with a robin emblem and red sleeves. Another FA Cup run ended against league opposition in the first round as Cardiff City won a replay following a 1-1 draw at Whaddon Road. In the league, Town had another bottom half finish. All 16 league wins came at home, and only on six occasions did Cheltenham avoid a league defeat away from Whaddon Road. Once again, the threat of closure hung over the club.

A promising start to the 1939-40 season was curtailed by the outbreak of World War II. Following a pause, the Southern League established a limited regional programme, often featuring guest players, and Cheltenham finished next to bottom of the league's Western division. At the season's end the club announced it would "not arrange any more fixtures until further notice".

1985–1999
They won promotion to the Alliance Premier League (now the Conference National) in 1985, but were relegated seven years later.

The appointment of Steve Cotterill as manager during the 1996–97 was the start of a period of success at the club which resulted in Cotterill being their most successful manager. Four months after taking charge he guided the club to runners-up spot in the Southern Football League Premier Division, but they won promotion to the Football Conference as champions Gresley Rovers were unable to meet the required ground capacity for Conference membership. In 1997–98, Cheltenham finished runners-up in the Conference and were close to champions Halifax Town until the end of April 1998. They secured a place at Wembley in the 1998 FA Trophy Final, beating Southport 1–0 in front of a crowd of 26,837 at Wembley Stadium. In 1998–99, Cheltenham secured the Conference title and entry to the Football League.

Football League (1999–2015)
After two mid-table finishes in Division Three, Cheltenham finally won promotion to Division Two (via the Division Three playoffs) at the end of the 2001–02 season. Shortly after winning promotion, Cotterill left Cheltenham to join Stoke City as their manager.

Cheltenham replaced Cotterill with first-team coach Graham Allner who had won the Conference championship with Kidderminster Harriers in 1994. Allner and assistant manager Mike Davis, who was originally assistant to Cotterill, were sacked in January 2003, after six months in the job, with Cheltenham near the foot of Division Two. Cheltenham turned to Bobby Gould, one of the most experienced managers in English football whose exploits include an FA Cup victory with Wimbledon in 1988. Cheltenham continued to struggle, and defeat in their final game of the season condemned the club to relegation back to Division Three after just one season. Gould resigned as Cheltenham Town manager in November 2003 and was replaced by John Ward.

During the 2005–06 season, a new stand for visiting fans was added (The Carlsberg Stand). They finished the season in 5th, earning a place in the play-offs. In the semi-final Cheltenham beat Wycombe Wanderers 2–1 away and drew 0–0 in the second leg at Whaddon Road. In the play-off final, Cheltenham beat Grimsby Town 1–0, securing a place in League One for 2006–07. The match at the Millennium Stadium on 28 May 2006 was attended by 29,196 people.

Cheltenham started life in League One with a 1–0 win against Gillingham. Following Cheltenham's 3–0 defeat to Port Vale, manager John Ward announced he had agreed a four-year contract with League One side Carlisle United. A highlight of the season was winning twice against Leeds United. Cheltenham's survival was secured on the final day of the season as they beat Doncaster Rovers 2–1 at Whaddon Road, denying their opposition automatic promotion.

Early in the 2008–09 season, Keith Downing left Cheltenham Town and was replaced by Martin Allen. Allen's team started poorly with a club-record seven defeats in a row, part of a 15-game run without a victory. The club narrowly avoided administration, and the 10-point penalty that would go with it, before Allen revealed that all the players at the club were up for sale. The season finished with Cheltenham's relegation back to League Two on the penultimate day of the season after three seasons in League One as they had conceded over 100 goals in all competitions.

Cheltenham won their first match of the 2009–10 season against Grimsby Town 2–1, but fell dramatically down the table soon after. On 20 October, Martin Allen was "put on gardening leave" amid allegations he racially abused a nightclub bouncer, and assistant manager John Schofield took temporary charge. Allen was formally cleared of misconduct but still left the club by mutual consent in early December. Former Cheltenham captain and Kidderminster boss Mark Yates was appointed manager on 22 December 2009. Cheltenham continued to struggle through the rest of the season, only managing to avoid relegation on the final day of the season, although they finished four points ahead of the relegated sides.

Yates, ahead of his first full season with Cheltenham, revamped the squad, releasing eight players, including defender Shane Duff, who had just completed his tenth year with the club. The season proved to be successful to begin with, with the Robins remaining close to the play-off positions, but they collapsed in the second half of the season and finished 17th, with only five wins in 26 games in 2011.

Despite losing in the first round of the League Cup, they reached the Football League Trophy south quarter-finals and were handed a lucrative tie at Tottenham Hotspur in the FA Cup third round. Yates won the Manager of the Month award for November after three wins from three The Robins ended the season in 6th and defeated Torquay United 2–0 at home and then 1–2 away in the League 2 Play-off Semi-finals. The Play-off Final was contested at Wembley Stadium on Sunday, 27 May 2012. Crewe Alexandra defeated Cheltenham Town 2–0 with goals from Nick Powell and Byron Moore in front of a crowd of 24,029.

The Robins also enjoyed a good run in the FA Cup, eventually losing out 5–1 to Premier League side Everton. On 6 November 2012, manager Mark Yates oversaw his 150th game in charge of the team in a 1–0 win against league leaders Gillingham. Cheltenham finished 5th, once again qualifying for the end of season play-offs after being pipped to the third promotion spot on the last day of the season by Rotherham United. The season included a run of 21 home league games without defeat. The play-offs saw Cheltenham face Northampton Town with Cheltenham losing both home and away games by 1–0.

After finishing in the play-offs for two consecutive seasons, Cheltenham Town's 2013–14 season proved to be difficult. Any hopes of a third consecutive play-off place were ended by March. The highlight of the season was a trip to Premier League side West Ham United, with the club eventually losing 2–1 at Upton Park. Cheltenham finished the season in 17th place.

On 25 November 2014, Mark Yates was sacked by Cheltenham Town after almost five years in charge. Cheltenham subsequently appointed Paul Buckle as team manager, but he was dismissed after just 79 days. In March 2015 Gary Johnson was appointed manager. In April 2015, after Bryan Jacob, a lifelong supporter, gave the club's supporters trust £222,000 in his will, members voted to use the money to accept a long-standing offer from the club for a permanent seat on its board of directors. Football fan Clive Gowing was subsequently elected. The club said it would also name a stand and supporters' player-of-the-season award in Jacob's memory. On 25 April 2015, Cheltenham Town lost at Whaddon Road to Shrewsbury Town, which meant that Cheltenham were relegated from the Football League after sixteen seasons.

Return to the Football League (2016–)
After only one season outside of the Football League, Cheltenham secured an immediate return on 16 April 2016 with a 2–0 home win against FC Halifax Town. The team amassed 101 points, scoring the most and conceding the fewest goals, on their way to becoming Champions, finishing 12 points clear of second-placed local rivals Forest Green. January signing Dan Holman was joint winner of the National League's Golden Boot award, with 30 goals, having netted 16 times in just 18 games for the Robins. Danny Wright, a summer signing, finished the season with 22 league goals and 11 assists, winning the Supporters Player of the Year award.

For the club's return to the Football League, manager Gary Johnson largely kept faith with the players that had won the previous year's National League. The 2016–17 season proved to be a struggle with a number of players finding the step up to League Two more difficult than had been hoped. The Whaddon Road pitch also came in for criticism, from both supporters and visiting managers, as it struggled to cope with its high levels of use (Gloucester City were in the final season of a ground-share at Cheltenham during 2016–17). Results improved somewhat during the spring, although Johnson was absent on sick leave from March onwards while recovering from heart bypass surgery, leaving his assistant Russell Milton in charge. The Robins secured their league status with a 1–0 win over Hartlepool United in the penultimate game of the season. They finished the season in 21st place.

During the close season a recovered Gary Johnson returned to work and signed a new two-year contract. He oversaw a major clearout of the squad with eleven players released. In the 2017–18 season the club ultimately only gained one point more than in the previous year (51 compared to 50), and finished in 17th place in League Two. By far the biggest success of an otherwise low-key year was Sudanese striker Mohamed Eisa. Signed as a free transfer from non-league football, Eisa scored 23 league goals for Cheltenham during the season and ultimately moved to Bristol City, for a transfer fee reportedly in excess of £1m (a club record sale), in July 2018. At the end of the season, long-serving club chairman Paul Baker stood down from the role after 20 years, handing over the chairmanship to Andy Wilcox.

On 10 September 2018, ex-Cheltenham player Michael Duff was appointed after the departure of Gary Johnson. Duff guided the Robins to 16th. The following 2019–20 season was very successful, narrowly missing out on automatic promotion in 4th place. Final league standings were decided on a points-per-game basis following disruption caused by the COVID-19 pandemic. Cheltenham missed out in the play-offs to Northampton Town, losing 3–2 on aggregate.

In 2020–21, Cheltenham returned to League One as champions after five seasons in League Two. Due to the ongoing disruption caused by COVID-19, the vast majority of fixtures in 2020–21 took place behind closed doors. The Robins reached the fourth round of the FA Cup for the first time since 2006 before narrowly losing out to eventual 2020–21 Premier League champions Manchester City. Cheltenham were leading the match with ten minutes to play before eventually losing 3–1. Cheltenham guaranteed their return to League One with a 1–1 draw at home to Carlisle United. On 8 May 2021, Cheltenham won their first ever EFL title, beating Harrogate Town 4–1 on the final day to secure the League Two championship.

Kit sponsors and manufacturers

Rivalries
Gloucestershire outfit Forest Green Rovers are currently seen as the club's main rivals. Fixtures between the two are humorously nicknamed El Glosico, a play on the "El Clasico" tag given to Barcelona vs Real Madrid matches. In recent years, the rivalry has grown heated due to the close proximity between the clubs, the fight for the 2015–16 National League title (Cheltenham and Forest Green finishing 1st and 2nd respectively) and, between 2017 and 2021, both competing in League Two.

Traditionally, Cheltenham's main rivals were Gloucestershire neighbours Gloucester City. Due to Cheltenham's rise up the leagues, the last competitive meeting between the two sides was in 1997, meaning the rivalry is now of less significance but is still keenly discussed by both sets of fans. They also used to maintain a fierce rivalry with Hereford United. This rivalry is also now of less significance, however, due to United going out of business in 2014 and reforming as Hereford FC. The new club and Cheltenham are yet to meet in a competitive fixture.

A survey conducted in August 2019 revealed that fans of The Robins also consider fellow West Country sides Bristol City, Bristol Rovers, Oxford United and Swindon Town as rivals.

Players

Current squad

Out on loan

Youth team

Player of the Year winners

Club management

 Head coach: Wade Elliott
 Assistant head coach: Russell Milton
 First team coach: Marcus Bignot
 Goalkeeping coach: James Bittner
 Head of medical: Gavin Crowe MSC MSST
 Sports therapist: James Redman
 Head of sports science: Sammy Gilchrist
 Performance analyst: Tom Carter
 Academy manager: Tim Bell
 Academy head of coaching: Dave Palmer
 Head groundsman: Matt Utteridge
 Kit man: James Murphy
 Club doctor: Sophie Risebero
 Director of football: Micky Moore

Club ownership 
The club is owned by a core ownership group of four large shareholders and numerous smaller shareholders.

The following have a "significant interest", as defined by the English Football League, in the club: Simon Keswick (who currently owns 29%), an individual represented by the Cayman Islands-based CTFC Investments Ltd (24%), former chairman of the club's board of directors Paul Baker (17%), and the Cheltenham Town supporters' trust the Robins Trust (9%).

The only one of the four main owners directly represented on the club's board are the Robins Trust in the form of fan-elected director Dave Beesley.

Board Of directors 
 Chairman: David Bloxham
 Vice chairman: Paul Bence
 Directors: Paul Godfrey, John Murphy, Clive Gowing, Paul Bence
 Fan-elected director: Dave Beesley
 Associate directors: Murry Toms, Mark Cuzner

Honours
Source:

League
Third Division / League Two (Tier 4)
Champions (1): 2020–21
Play-off winners: 2001–02, 2005–06
Play-off runners-up: 2011–12
Conference National (Tier 5)
Champions (2): 1998–99, 2015–16
Runners-up: 1997–98
Southern League
Champions (1): 1984–85
Runners-up: 1955–56, 1992–93, 1993–94, 1994–95, 1996–97
Southern League Midland Division
Champions (1): 1982–83
Southern League Division 1 North
Runners-up: 1976–77

Cups
FA Trophy
Winners (1): 1997–98

Other honours:
Leamington Hospital Cup – Winners (1934–35)
Midland Floodlit Cup – Winners (1985–86, 1986–87, 1987–88)
Gloucestershire Senior Cup – Winners (1998–99)
Cheltenham League – Winners (1910–11, 1913–14)
Gloucestershire Senior Amateur North Challenge Cup – Winners (1929–30, 1930–31, 1932–33, 1933–34, 1934–35)

Managerial history

Club records
As of 5 February 2021

 Record attendance 
 10,389 vs. Blackpool, FA Cup 3rd round, 13 January 1934 at Athletic Ground, Cheltenham
 Record attendance at Whaddon Road
8,326 vs Reading, FA Cup 1st round, 17 November 1956
 Record transfer paid
£50,000 Jermaine McGlashan from Aldershot Town (January 2012), Brian Wilson from Stoke City and Grant McCann from West Ham United 
 Record transfer received
£1.5m Mo Eisa to Bristol City (July 2018)
 Record win
12–0 vs Chippenham Rovers, FA Cup 3rd qualifying round, 2 November 1935
 Record defeat
1-10 vs Merthyr Tydfil, Southern League, 8 March 1952
 Record appearances
Roger Thorndale – 703 (1958–1976)
 Record goalscorer
Dave Lewis – 290 
 Record goals in a season
Dave Lewis, 53 in all competitions (1974–1975)
 Fastest Goal
 Graham Green vs Hillingdon Borough, 11 Seconds, Southern League, 11 February 1967 
 Oldest player
Derek Bragg (aged 42 years 2 months 23 days) vs Farnborough Town 7 April 1999
 Youngest player
Cameron Walters (aged 16 years, 9 days) vs West Ham United Under 21 18 October 2022

References

External links

Official website

 
1887 establishments in England
Association football clubs established in 1887
Sport in Cheltenham
Football clubs in Gloucestershire
Football clubs in England
Cheltenham Association Football League
Southern Football League clubs
National League (English football) clubs
English Football League clubs